David was the third king of the united Kingdom of Israel and Judeah

King David may also refer to:

People
 David I (disambiguation)
 David II (disambiguation)
 David III of Tao
 David IV of Georgia (1073–1125)
 David V of Georgia (died 1155)
 David VI of Georgia (1225–1293)
 David VII of Georgia (1215–1270)
 David VIII of Georgia (1273–1311)
 David IX of Georgia (died 1360)
 David X of Kartli (1482–1526)
 Capleton (born 1967), Jamaican reggae artist also known as King David
 Kalākaua (1836–1891), born David Laʻamea Kamanakapuʻu Mahinulani Nalaiaehuokalani Lumialani Kalākaua, the penultimate Hawaiian monarch
 David Barksdale (1947–1974), Chicago gang leader

Other uses
 King David (film), 1985 biographical film starring Richard Gere
 King David (musical), 1997 musical created by Tim Rice and Alan Menken
 Le roi David, composition by Arthur Honegger
 The King David Hotel in Jerusalem

See also
 David King (disambiguation)
 King David School (disambiguation)